Lot 21 is a township in Queens County, Prince Edward Island, Canada.  It is part of Greenville Parish. Lot 21 was awarded to Hugh and Lauchlin MacLeane in the 1767 land lottery. Merchant Robert Clark became owner in 1775.

Communities

Incorporated municipalities:

 Stanley Bridge, Hope River, Bayview, Cavendish and North Rustico

Civic address communities:

 Fredericton
 French River
 Grahams Road
 Granville
 Millvale
 New London
 Park Corner
 Pleasant Valley
 South Granville
 Springbrook
 Springfield
 Stanley Bridge

References

21
Geography of Queens County, Prince Edward Island